Michelle Benjamin is a Trinidad and Tobago politician representing the United National Congress. She has served as a Member of Parliament in the House of Representatives for Moruga/Tableland since the 2020 general election.

Early life 
Benjamin was born in St Mary’s Village, Moruga. She attended St Mary’s Government Primary School, Cowen Hamilton Secondary School and Southern Community College. She then received a diploma in computer studies from the School of Accounting and Management and a bachelor's of science in environmental and natural resource management and biology from the University of the West Indies. She previously worked for the Ministry of Community Development.

Political career 
In 2010, Benjamin joined the United National Congress (UNC) and became a community activist with the party after being inspired by UNC leader Kamla Persad-Bissessar. She was elected as a councillor for the local government district of Hindustan/St. Mary’s in 2016, a position that she was re-elected to in 2019. Since 2017, she has served as the chair of the Moruga/Tableland UNC Executive. She is the current public relations officer for the St Mary’s Village Council.

Benjamin was elected to the House of Representatives on 10 August 2020, following the 2020 general election where she ran as the UNC candidate for the constituency of Moruga/Tableland.

Personal life 
Benjamin is a Baptist.

References 

Living people
Year of birth missing (living people)
Members of the House of Representatives (Trinidad and Tobago)
21st-century Trinidad and Tobago women politicians
21st-century Trinidad and Tobago politicians
United National Congress politicians
University of the West Indies alumni